Elections in Himachal Pradesh for the Himachal Pradesh Legislative Assembly in Himachal Pradesh state, India are conducted in accordance with the Constitution of India.

Lok Sabha elections 

Keys:

Legislative Assembly elections

1952 Legislative Assembly election

1967 Legislative Assembly election

1972 Legislative Assembly election

1977 Legislative Assembly election

1982 Legislative Assembly election

1985 Legislative Assembly election

1990 Legislative Assembly election

1993 Legislative Assembly election

1998 Legislative Assembly election

Keys:

2003 Legislative Assembly election

Keys:

2007 Legislative Assembly election

The 2007 Himachal Pradesh legislative assembly election were held in Himachal Pradesh in 2007.

Keys:

2012 Legislative Assembly election

Keys:

2017 Legislative Assembly election

BJP won 44 out of 68 seats to form the government, ousting Congress party from power. Indian National Congress won 21 seats. Jai Ram Thakur was appointed as Chief Minister after the elections.

Keys:

2022 Legislative Assembly election 

Keys:

See also
 All India Tribes and Minorities Front

References

 Himachal Pradesh Election Results